This is a list of Starfinder books for the Starfinder science fantasy role-playing game.

Rulebooks

Adventures

Adventure Paths

Standalone adventures

Starfinder Society

Season 1: Year of Scoured Stars

Season 2: Year of a Thousand Bites

Season 3: Year of Exploration's Edge

Season 4: Year of the Data Scourge

Miscellaneous

See also 
List of Pathfinder books

References 

Lists about role-playing games